Executive Order 13985, officially titled Advancing Racial Equity and Support for Underserved Communities Through the Federal Government, is the first executive order signed by U.S. President Joe Biden on January 20, 2021. It directs the federal government to revise agency policies to account for racial inequities in their implementation.

Provisions 
According to the order, converging economic, health, and climate crises have exposed and exacerbated inequities. The order, therefore, announces that the Biden administration will pursue a comprehensive approach to advancing equity for all, in particular by fighting systemic racism. By promoting the federal government's equality, we can generate chances to strengthen historically neglected neighborhoods that benefit everyone. A study, for instance, suggests that narrowing racial divisions in salaries, home loans, lending possibilities, and access to higher education would equal $5 trillion more in the U.S. economy in the next five years. The federal government's objective to promote equity is to provide everyone the chance to achieve their full potential. Each agency must examine, in accordance with these goals, whether its programs and policies maintain structural obstacles to opportunities and benefits for persons of color and other under-served groups and what extent. Such evaluations would better enable agencies to formulate policies and programs that provide equitable resources and benefits for all.

Effects 
Within sixty days of the date of the order, the heads of federal departments are to consider halting, revising, or rescinding all activity related to or resulting from Donald Trump's Executive Order 13950.

See also 

 List of executive actions by Joe Biden

References

External links 

 US Presidential Actions
 Federal Register
Executive Order On Advancing Racial Equity and Support for Underserved Communities Through the Federal Government

2021 in American law
Executive orders of Joe Biden
January 2021 events in the United States